The Canning Jarrah Timber Company was a timber and timber railway company operating in the Darling Range in Western Australia in the 1890s.

The company was registered in London in 1898.

It built the Upper Darling Range Railway.  The railway developed the communities of Canning Mills, Kalamunda, and nearby locations, enabling delivery of materials to Perth; this included timber and other produce.

The railway was taken over by the Western Australian Government Railways in 1903.

The company was absorbed into Millars Karri and Jarrah Forests Limited in 1902.

References

Timber companies of Western Australia
Railway companies disestablished in 1903
Darling Range